James Pitts VC  MSM (26 February 1877 – 18 February 1955) was an English recipient of the Victoria Cross, the highest and most prestigious award for gallantry in the face of the enemy that can be awarded to British and Commonwealth forces.

Details
Pitts was 22 years old, and a private in the 1st Battalion, The Manchester Regiment, British Army during the Second Boer War when the following deed in Natal took place for which he and Private Robert Scott were awarded the VC:

 
He later achieved the rank of corporal and served in World War I He was awarded the Meritorious Service Medal in 1918.

The Medal

His Victoria Cross is displayed at the Museum of the Manchesters, Ashton-under-Lyne, England.

In 2019, a plaque in his honour was unveiled at Blackburn town hall.

References

The Four Blackburn VC's (HL Kirby and RR Walsh)
Monuments to Courage (David Harvey, 1999)
The Register of the Victoria Cross (This England, 1997)
Victoria Crosses of the Anglo-Boer War (Ian Uys, 2000)

External links
 Location of grave and VC medal (Lancashire)
 

Second Boer War recipients of the Victoria Cross
British recipients of the Victoria Cross
Manchester Regiment soldiers
People from Blackburn
1877 births
1955 deaths
British Army personnel of the Second Boer War
British Army personnel of World War I
British Army recipients of the Victoria Cross
Recipients of the Meritorious Service Medal (United Kingdom)